The year 1949 in science and technology involved some significant events, listed below.

Astronomy and space exploration
 June 14 – Albert II, a rhesus monkey, becomes the first mammal in space, in a U.S.-launched V-2 rocket, reaching an altitude of 83 miles (134 km) but dying on impact after a parachute failure.

Chemistry
 Radiocarbon dating technique discovered by Willard Libby and his colleagues at the University of Chicago—work for which Libby will receive the Nobel prize in 1960.
 A group including Dorothy Hodgkin publish the three-dimensional molecular structure of penicillin, demonstrating that it contains a β-lactam ring.

Computer science
 April – Manchester Mark 1 computer operable at the University of Manchester in England.
 May 6 – EDSAC, the first practicable stored-program computer, runs its first program at University of Cambridge in England, to calculate a table of squares.

Earth sciences
 August 5 – Ambato earthquake in Ecuador, measuring 6.8 on the Richter magnitude scale.
 Patomskiy crater in Siberia is discovered by Russian geologist Vadim Kolpakov.

History of science
 Herbert Butterfield publishes The Origins of Modern Science, 1300-1800.

Mathematics
 Ákos Császár discovers the Császár polyhedron.
 D. R. Kaprekar discovers the convergence property of the number 6174.

Medicine
 The use of lithium salts to control mania is rediscovered by Australian psychiatrist John Cade, the first mood stabilizer.
 First implant of intraocular lens, by Sir Harold Ridley
 First Sixteen Personality Factor Questionnaire, a self-report personality test, released.

Meteorology
 January 11 – Los Angeles, California receives its first recorded snowfall.

Philosophy
 Gilbert Ryle's book The Concept of Mind, a founding document in the philosophy of mind, is published.

Physics
 Freeman Dyson demonstrates the equivalence of the formulations of quantum electrodynamics existing at this time, incidentally inventing the Dyson series.
 The Lanczos tensor is introduced in general relativity by Cornelius Lanczos.
 Pauli–Villars regularization is first published.

Zoology
 J. B. S. Haldane proposes the Darwin as a unit of evolutionary change.
 Konrad Lorenz publishes King Solomon's Ring (Er redete mit dem Vieh, den Vögeln und den Fischen).

Awards
 Nobel Prizes
 Physics – Yukawa Hideki
 Chemistry – William Francis Giauque
 Medicine – Walter Rudolf Hess, Antonio Caetano De Abreu Freire Egas Moniz

Births
 January 25 – Paul Nurse, English cell biologist, winner of the Nobel Prize in Physiology or Medicine.
 February 1 – Alice Alldredge, Australian-born oceanographer.
 February 17 – Peter Piot, Belgian microbiologist and epidemiologist.
 February 19 – Danielle Bunten Berry, born Dan(iel Paul) Bunten (died 1998), American software developer.
 February 22 – Tullio Pozzan (died 2022), Italian biochemist.
 March 28 – Michael W. Young, American geneticist and chronobiologist, winner of the Nobel Prize in Physiology or Medicine.
 April 5 – Judith Resnik (died 1986), American astronaut.
 April 18 – Yasumasa Kanada, Japanese mathematician.
 May 24 – Tomaž Pisanski, Slovenian mathematician.
 May 26 – Ward Cunningham, American computer programmer.
 June 2 – Heather Couper (died 2020), English astronomer.
 July 23 – Andrew Odlyzko, Polish-born American mathematician.
 August 31 – H. David Politzer, American physicist, winner of the Nobel Prize in Physics.
 November 24 – Sally Davies, English Chief Medical Officer.
 Michael Houghton, British-born virologist, winner of the Nobel Prize in Physiology or Medicine.

Deaths
 February 22 – Félix d'Herelle (died 1873), French-Canadian microbiologist, a co-discoverer of bacteriophages.
 April 28 – Robert Robertson (born 1869), British chemist.
 May 27
 Ægidius Elling (born 1861), Norwegian gas turbine pioneer.
 Martin Knudsen (born 1871), Danish physicist.
 August 5 – Ernest Fourneau (born 1872), French medicinal chemist.

References

 
20th century in science
1940s in science